Grand Bruit (means "great noise" in French) is a designated place and former settlement in the Canadian province of Newfoundland and Labrador. It is on the southwestern coast of the island of Newfoundland. Grand Bruit was resettled in 2010. The community was divided down the middle by a waterfall, hence the name "Grand Bruit" which is French for "great noise".

History 
Grand Bruit was founded in the early 19th century. It experienced depopulation related to changing economic and demographic conditions in rural Newfoundland, in particular the collapse of the Newfoundland cod fisheries in the early 1990s.

The last school in the community closed on June 22, 2007, as the last students from the town graduated from elementary school.

By 2009, Grand Bruit had an aging population of 31. By September 2009, 26 out of 31 residents had voted their intent to move the community and take payouts from the Government of Newfoundland and Labrador of $100,000. A provincial law on resettling outports requires 90 percent of a community to consent to relocation before a community can be moved. Residents have the option to apply for government permits to return to their homes seasonally for use as summer cottages.

, the last remaining residents of Grand Bruit accepted the provincial government's offer of $80,000 per household ($90,000 offered to households of two or more residents). By 2010, the last permanent residents had relocated and ferry service ceased.

Geography 
Grand Bruit is in Newfoundland within Subdivision I of Division No. 3. It is east of Channel-Port aux Basques.

Demographics 

Arts and culture 
Grand Bruit was featured on the Vice TV channel on Abandoned.

See also 
List of designated places in Newfoundland and Labrador
Newfoundland outport
Resettlement (Newfoundland)

References

External links 
Art portraying the town just prior to its resettlement
Grand Bruit 2011 Part 1 of 2 (video)

Designated places in Newfoundland and Labrador
2010 disestablishments in Newfoundland and Labrador
Car-free zones in Canada
Ghost towns in Newfoundland and Labrador